Vladimir Ignatevich Brovikov (Belarusian: Уладзімір Ігнатавіч Бровікаў) (12 May 1931 – 10 February 1992) was the Chairman of the Council of Ministers of Byelorussian Soviet Socialist Republic from 8 July 1983 to 10 January 1986. He was preceded by Aleksandr Aksyonov and succeeded by Mikhail Kovalyov.

1931 births
1992 deaths
People from Vietka District
Central Committee of the Communist Party of the Soviet Union members
Tenth convocation members of the Supreme Soviet of the Soviet Union
Eleventh convocation members of the Soviet of Nationalities
Ambassadors of the Soviet Union to Poland
Members of the Central Committee of the Communist Party of Byelorussia
Heads of government of the Byelorussian Soviet Socialist Republic
Members of the Supreme Soviet of the Byelorussian Soviet Socialist Republic
Belarusian State University alumni
Recipients of the Order of Lenin
Burials at Novodevichy Cemetery